Moline High School is a public four-year high school located in Moline, Illinois, a city in Rock Island County, in the Midwest area of the United States. The school is the only public high school in the city of Moline, and is part of Moline-Coal Valley School District #40.

Building history
After the founding of the Moline Board of Education, Moline High School took the form of a two-room schoolhouse.  
It was replaced with Central/Washington school, which housed grades 1-13, after its building completion in 1873. This, of course, was notably larger.

Still getting progressively more spacious, a building nicknamed "the Castle" by passing travelers on the Mississippi became the new Moline High School in 1894. Its moniker referred to the architectural style which took a departure from the basic rectangular designs. It became "Central Grammar", an eighth-grade school, when the new 1914 building was built nearby. Central then was used as an annex for the high school on the same land, and as that became less necessary, Moline Community College occupied rooms. The basement was used as a recreational center as the building was losing its purpose.

Finally, the most recent facility was built on the Avenue of the Cities.  In close proximity to the former middle school, Calvin Coolidge, and the Roosevelt elementary school, the 1958 building is the most developed. It was built at a cost of about $4 million, which equates to nearly $30 million in today's money. One of the more striking designs featuring outer walls made nearly completely from glass, it introduced protruding wings which provided for fairly spacious classrooms and subject specialization. The large property allowed the architects to spread out the design, with one hallway stretching over 800 feet long.  Despite its three-floor-section and countless classrooms, in 1968, a new J-wing and West gym were constructed to compensate for the over-population. It currently contains about 2,400 students from the combined Moline and Coal Valley areas as well as many teachers from the main Quad Cities area.

Music Program 
Moline High School has various musical ensembles including Freshman Band, Concert Band, Symphonic Band, Concert Orchestra, Symphonic Orchestra, Concert Choir, A Capella Choir, Freshman Chorus, Treble Chorus, Jazz Ensemble, Jazz Band, and Chamber Orchestra.

Bartlett Performing Arts Center 
In May 2017, it was announced that a $7 million grant from the Robert E. Bartlett Family Foundation would be given to the high school to fund a new performing arts center. It was also revealed that the school district would pitch in $3 million more raised from local sales tax. In March 2019, the Bartlett Performing Arts Center opened to the public.

New Athletic Facility 

Due to the growing population of the school (over 2000 students), there is a huge need for new athletic facilities at Moline High School. The gymnasiums and weight rooms are operating at full-capacity during the school day. In the winter of 2020, Moline will have a new, state-of-the-art facility with a "six-lane track, four multi-use courts, improved locker rooms, and a weight room." The construction (and renovation) project is valued at 14 million dollars and will allow for a safer space to hold physical and recreational activities for students. Instead of using local taxpayer money, the district will be funding the project through an eight-year bond repayment program.  Although the current plan does not include a new pool, the Board of Education has established a committee that is working on finding a partner to help with the financial commitment. The pool hasn't been updated in over sixty years.

Wharton Field House

This indoor arena, located a mile and a half from the high school campus, can house up to 6,000 fans at a time. The field house, built just under a century ago (in 1928), has become a local treasure and a historic landmark for the Moline community. In May 2020, Wharton Field House made the final four in a Twitter poll where users voted to determine the "Best Gym in Illinois."

Athletics

Girls' Softball
Softball has been an official sport in Illinois since 1976, and Moline has won the state title six times (in 1987, 1988, 1994, 1996, 2006, 2011)—putting them in second place in the number of state softball titles, behind leader Casey Westfield which has seven titles. 
Moline is one of five schools that has won titles in back-to-back seasons.
In the 2005–06 season, Moline won more games than any other school in the history of the state of Illinois without posting a loss, compiling a (40–0–1) record, and winning the girls' AA state title.

Boys Basketball

2023 4A State Champion

Notable alumni

 Bonnie Bartlett: television and film actress
 Louis Bellson: jazz drummer
 Ken Berry: actor
 Don Carothers: football player
 Brad Cresswell: radio broadcaster and opera singer
 Acie Earl: professional basketball player, Boston Celtics
 Mickey Erickson: professional football player, Chicago Cardinals and Boston Braves
 Brad Hopkins: professional football player, Tennessee Titans
 Jim Jamieson: professional golfer
 Steve Kuberski: professional basketball player, Boston Celtics
 Dayton Moore: Kansas City Royals General Manager
 Stephen Norton: Drummer for Louden Swain
 Tom Railsback: U.S. Congressman from 1967–83
 Jeremy Schoemaker: internet entrepreneur
 Donald K. Sundquist: former governor of Tennessee

References

External links 
 Illinois High School Association (official site)

Public high schools in Illinois
Buildings and structures in Moline, Illinois
Schools in Rock Island County, Illinois
Educational institutions established in 1908
1908 establishments in Illinois